Slate gray is a gray color with a slight azure tinge that is a representation of the average color of the material slate. As a tertiary color, slate is an equal mix of purple and green pigments.

Slaty, referring to this color, is often used to describe birds.

The first recorded use of slate gray as a color name in English was in 1705.


Variations

Light slate gray

Displayed at right is the web color light slate gray.

Dark slate gray

Displayed at right is the web color dark slate gray.

In human culture
Computers

 The exterior shells of supercomputers are often colored various shades of slate gray.
 The iPhone 5 and the iPad Mini comes in a Dark slate gray colored aluminum body contrasted with black.
 Western Electric used the term SLATE for the color instead of gray in their 25-pair (and multiples) cable for pairs 5-10-15-20-25.

Transportation

 The S New York City Subway service bullet, used in three out of the system's  services, is colored slate gray.

See also
 List of colors

References

Tertiary colors
Shades of gray